The Pakistan cricket team won the World Cup in 1992 under the captaincy of Imran Khan. Pakistan have also been runners up at the 1999 Cricket World Cup where they lost to Australia in the Final. They have been Semi Finalists 4 times (1979, 1983, 1987 & 2011) and have also reached the Quarter Finals twice (1996 & 2015). Pakistan's historical win–loss record at the cricket world cup is 45-32, with 3 no results. Javed Miandad has appeared in six cricket world cups which is more than any other player from Pakistan.

Overall record

By tournament

White: Group/round-robin stage

By opponent

Pakistan at the 1975 World Cup

Group B

Pakistan at the 1979 World Cup

Group A

Semi-final

Pakistan at the 1983 World Cup

Group A

Semi-final

Pakistan at the 1987 World Cup

Pakistan were the favourites going into the 1987 World Cup.

Group B

Semi-final

Pakistan at the 1992 World Cup

Round-robin stage

Points table

Tournament progression

Semi-final

Final

Pakistan at the 1996 World Cup

Group B

Quarter-final

Pakistan at the 1999 World Cup

Group B

Super Six

Teams who qualified for the Super Six stage only played against the teams from the other group; results against the other teams from the same group were carried forward to this stage. As a result Pakistan carried forward 4 points from the group stage, with their wins against Australia and New Zealand. Results against the non-qualifying teams were therefore discarded at this point.

Semi-final

Final

Pakistan at the 2003 World Cup

Pool A

Pakistan at the 2007 World Cup

Group D

Pakistan at the 2011 World Cup

Group A

Knockout stage

Quarter-final

Semi-final

Pakistan at the 2015 World Cup

Pool B

Knockout stage

Quarter-final

Pakistan at the 2019 World Cup

There were eerie similarities between Pakistan's performance in the group stage in the 2019 and 1992 World Cups.

Group stage

Points table

Batting records

Highest team score

Highest individual innings

Highest successful run chase

Most runs

Most runs in a single tournament

Most centuries

Most fifties

Highest averages

Most sixes

Lowest team score

Most ducks

Bowling records

Most wickets

Most wickets in a single tournament

Best bowling figures

Most five-wicket hauls

Most four-wicket hauls

Wicket-keeping records

Most dismissals

Most dismissals in an innings

Most dismissals in a tournament

Fielding records

Most catches

Most catches in an innings

Most catches in a tournament

Partnership records

Highest partnership by wicket

Highest partnerships by runs

Most matches

Most matches as a player

Most matches as a captain

References

Pakistan in international cricket
History of the Cricket World Cup
Pakistani cricket lists